"Kuchizuke" ("Kiss") is the thirtieth single by the Japanese rock band Buck Tick, released on September 1, 2010. The song was used as opening theme of the anime Shiki.

Track listing

Charts
The single peaked at the 7th position on the Oricon Singles Chart.

Personnel 
 Atsushi Sakurai - singing
 Hisashi Imai - lead guitar
 Hidehiko "Hide" Hoshino- rhythm guitar
 Yutaka "U-ta" Higuchi- bass
 Yagami Toll - drums

References

2010 singles
Buck-Tick songs
Anime songs
2010 songs
Ariola Japan singles
Songs with lyrics by Atsushi Sakurai
Songs with music by Hisashi Imai